Fındığan (also, Fyndygan and Yukhary Fyndygan) is a village and municipality in the Khizi Rayon of Azerbaijan.  It has a population of 405.

References 

Populated places in Khizi District